The list of rectors of University of Rostock lists all those who became the rector of the University of Rostock since its foundation in 1419.

15th century

1419–1436

1437–1443

1444–1469

1470–1499

16th century

1500–1519

1520–1539

1540–1559

1560–1579

1580–1599

17th century

1600–1619

1620–1639

1640–1659

1660–1679

1680–1699

18th century

1700–1719

1720–1739

1740–1759

1760–1779

1780–1799 
Since unification of Bützow University and Rostock University in 1789, Rectors were elected for one year.

19th century

1800–1824

1825–1849

1850–1874

1875–1899

20th century

1900–1994 

Restructuring of the University of Rostock

1994–1999 
With the State Higher Education Act of 9 February 1994, a 4-year term Rector was introduced.

21st century

Since 2000

Literature 
 Angela Hartwig, Tilmann Schmidt (eds): The Rectors of the University of Rostock - 1419-2000. In: Contributions to the History of the University of Rostock. Issue 23 University Press Rostock University Archives 2000. .

External links 
Current rector of the University of Rostock
Three major Rectors of the University of Rostock
Monumenta inedita rerum Germanicarum praecipue Cimbricarum, et Megapolensium, quibus varia antiquitatum, historiarum, legum, juriumque Germaniae, speciatim Holsatiae et Megapoleos vicinarumque regionum argumenta illustrantur. E codicibus manuscriptis, membranis et chartis authenticis erui studuit ... Et cum praefatione instruxit Ernestus Joachimus de Westphalen, Leipzig 1743, Sp. 1005-1308: Rektorenliste der Universität Rostock

Notes and references 

Rectors